Al-Jihad Sport Club, is an Iraqi football team based in Wasit, that plays in the Iraq Division Two.

Managerial history
  Wissam Mohsin

See also 
 2021–22 Iraq Division Two

References

External links
 Iraq Clubs- Foundation Dates

2003 establishments in Iraq
Association football clubs established in 2003
Football clubs in Wasit